Kriukai  (Samogitian: Kriokā) is a small town in Šiauliai County in northern Lithuania. In  2011, it had a population of 533.

Gallery

References

This article was initially translated from the Lithuanian Wikipedia.

Towns in Lithuania
Towns in Šiauliai County
Shavelsky Uyezd